Bruce Ford was a member of the Canadian Rowing team in the 1984 and 1988 Olympics, winning a Bronze medal in the 1984 Men's Quadruple Sculls. Alongside Pat Walter, he won Gold in the Double Sculls at the 1986 Commonwealth Games.

Educated at Brentwood College School, Vancouver Island and the University of British Columbia, he now works as an Environmental Biologist in Vancouver. Ford lives in North Vancouver as of May 2017.

Footnotes

Living people
University of British Columbia alumni
Olympic rowers of Canada
Olympic bronze medalists for Canada
Simon Fraser University alumni
Rowers at the 1984 Summer Olympics
Rowers at the 1988 Summer Olympics
Olympic medalists in rowing
Canadian male rowers
Rowers at the 1986 Commonwealth Games
Commonwealth Games gold medallists for Canada
Commonwealth Games medallists in rowing
Pan American Games medalists in rowing
Pan American Games gold medalists for Canada
1954 births
Rowers at the 1979 Pan American Games
Medalists at the 1984 Summer Olympics
Medallists at the 1986 Commonwealth Games